The Sioux Ordnance Depot Fire & Guard Headquarters, near Sidney, Nebraska, was built in 1942.  It was listed on the National Register of Historic Places in 1994.  The listing included a contributing building and a contributing structure.

It was part of a World War II-era munitions depot, which operated until 1967.  The listing consists of the two-story headquarters building and "vintage cedar tree plantings".  It is located at the junction of 1st Ave. and Military Rd.

In 1994 it was used as a volunteer fire station for the Western Nebraska Community College, as the Western Nebraska Community College Fire Station.

References

Fire stations in Nebraska
National Register of Historic Places in Cheyenne County, Nebraska
Buildings and structures completed in 1942
World War II on the National Register of Historic Places